San Felipe, known colloquially as "San Felipe Torres Mochas", is a Mexican city and municipality located in the northwest region of the state of Guanajuato. The municipality has an area of 2,969.79 square kilometers (9.50% of the state's surface), making it the biggest municipality in terms of size. It is bordered to the north by the municipality of Ocampo, to the south by the municipalities of León and Guanajuato, to the southeast by the municipality of Dolores Hidalgo and to the east by the municipality of San Diego de la Unión. It borders to the north with the state of San Luis Potosí and to the west with the state of Jalisco. The municipality had 106,952 inhabitants as of 2010.

History 
San Felipe was founded by Francisco de Velasco on January 21, 1562, by orders of viceroy Luís de Velasco. The city was founded with the name of San Felipe in honor of King Philip II of Spain. In 1889 the name of the city was changed to "Ciudad González" in honor of the then governor of Guanajuato, Manuel González. The name of the city was again changed in 1938, this time to "Ciudad Hernández Álvarez", after governor Enrique Hernández Álvarez. In 1948 the city's name was reverted to the original name of "San Felipe". Regardless of the several official names the city was given through time, it was always colloquially known as "San Felipe Torres Mochas" (lit. "San Felipe stub-towers"), a nickname that persists to this day.

Climate

Demographics 
As of the census of 2010 there were 106,952 people and 22,830 households in the municipality, representing a population increase of 11,056 from the previous census in 2005. The population density was 36.01/km2 (93.3/sq mi), with an average of 4.7 people per household.

Economy 
The economy of the municipality is based mostly on the textile industry.

See also
María Auxiliadora, Guanajuato

References

External links 
  
Municipal data from the 2010 census 

Populated places in Guanajuato
Municipalities of Guanajuato
Populated places established in 1562
1562 establishments in New Spain
1560s establishments in Mexico